Billboard Greece is a Greek online magazine that launched on 18 March 2011. It serves as the localized version of Billboard, also featuring independent coverage of both Greek and international music repertoire.

Background
Billboard was first introduced to the Greek public in the 1970s. Giannis Petridis was the first to present the top 10 from his radio show, where he also regularly presented various reports from the magazine.

The complete presentation of the top 10 singles and albums, and later the top 20, was started in 1976 on the radio show "Studio 344" hosted by Akis Evenis on B. Program. The presentation would take place every Friday, a week earlier than the official publication of Billboard in the United States, as he would receive the charts directly from Voice of America.

On 2 February 2011, it was announced that a Greek version of Billboard called Billboard Greece would launch online by the end of the month. The date was later pushed back to 14 March 2011, then once again to 18 March 2011.

Content
Billboard Greece is an online magazine, featuring independent coverage, but also works closely with Billboard and has access to its exclusive press content. Billboard Greece covers all genres of music, and is not limited to specific types only. At launch, it planned to allocate 70% of its coverage to international repertoire and 30% to domestic repertoire.

The site also feature interviews of artists—both written and on video—as well as exclusive broadcasts of songs, reviews of concerts in real time, reviews on albums and songs, tributes, and an agenda of all the music events taking place in Athens. Billboard Greece also plans to organize concerts and fan gatherings, and will support a wide range of music event in all of Greece.

Charts
Billboard Greece currently includes the following domestic and international charts, and plans to add more in the future:

International
Billboard 200
Billboard Hot 100
Dance Club Songs

Domestic
Billboard Greek Airplay
MTV Hit List (MTV Greece)

Contributors
Giannis Petridis serves as the consultant of Billboard Greece, with Maria Markouli and Dimitris Kanellopoulos serving as head editors. The contributing photographers are Olga K. and Nikos Maravegias, while the editorial team is made up of high-profile editors in music reporting, amongst them:

 Katerina Kafentzi (En Lefko 87.7)
 Giorgos Mouhtaridis
 Haris Pontida
 Matoula Kousteni (Eleftherotypia)
 Nikos Triantfillidis
 Giannis Papaefthimiou
 Evi Eleftheriadou
 Tina Pappa
 Efi Papazahariou
 Vasia Tzanakari
 Maro Papanagiotakopoulou
 Spiros Dimas

 Fotis Valatos (LiFo)
 Theodoris Mihos (Esquire)
 Inkrint Kehagi
 Fotini Kokkinaki
 Aris Karapeazis
 Giannis Papagopoulos (Ethnos)
 Nikos Petropoulakis (105.5 Sto Kokkino)
 Thodoris Kanellopoulos (Imako)
Ermis Theodoropoulos
 Markos Fragkos
 Manolis Kilsmanis
 Klimentini Markou

References

External links
 Official website

Billboard (magazine)
Magazines about the media
Magazines established in 2011
Online music magazines
2011 establishments in Greece
Magazines published in Greece
Greek-language magazines
Monthly magazines